Arthur Olsen (February 13, 1914 – August 8, 2014) was an American politician who was a Democratic member of the Nevada General Assembly. An attorney, he is an alumnus of DePaul University. He was admitted to the bar in 1952.

References

1914 births
2014 deaths
American centenarians
Men centenarians
Nevada Democrats